United Church of Christ, Congregational may refer to:

United Church of Christ, Congregational (Burlington, Massachusetts), associated, with DR status, with the National Register of Historic Places in Middlesex County, Massachusetts
United Church of Christ, Congregational (Fort Pierre, South Dakota), listed on the National Register of Historic Places in Stanley County, South Dakota